White Voices is a 1964 Italian comedy film directed by Pasquale Festa Campanile and Massimo Franciosa. It was screened out of competition at the 1964 Cannes Film Festival.

Cast
 Paolo Ferrari as Meo
 Sandra Milo as Carolina
 Graziella Granata as Teresa
 Anouk Aimée as Lorenza
 Vittorio Caprioli as Matteuccio
 Jeanne Valérie as Maria
 Philippe Leroy as Don Ascanio
 Barbara Steele as Giulia
 Leopoldo Trieste as 'Orapronobbi'
 Jacqueline Sassard as Eugenia
 Claudio Gora as Marchionne
 Jean Tissier as Principe Savello

References

External links

1964 films
1964 comedy films
1960s Italian-language films
Films set in Rome
Films directed by Pasquale Festa Campanile
Films directed by Massimo Franciosa
Commedia all'italiana
Films set in the 18th century
1960s Italian films